The early Liverpool-class lifeboats used by the Royal National Lifeboat Institution (RNLI) were 'Pulling and Sailing' types (P&S) (i.e. powered by oars and sails) and should not be confused with the later one or two engined Liverpool-class motorised lifeboats.

Description 
The Liverpool-class 'Pulling and Sailing' lifeboats were of a non-self righting type of lifeboat of various dimensions and various numbers of oars used by the Royal National Lifeboat Institution (RNLI). Typically they were launched from carriages into the sea.

The development of the Liverpool-class motorised lifeboats enabled longer range of operation and smaller crews (i.e. no need for oarsmen).

Fleet

References